The language bioprogram theory or language bioprogram hypothesis (LBH) is a theory arguing that the structural similarities between different creole languages cannot be solely attributed to their superstrate and substrate languages.  As articulated mostly by Derek Bickerton, creolization occurs when the linguistic exposure of children in a community consists solely of a highly unstructured pidgin; these children use their innate language capacity to transform the pidgin, which characteristically has high syntactic variability, into a language with a highly structured grammar. As this capacity is universal, the grammars of these new languages have many similarities.

Syntactic similarities
By comparing Hawaiian Creole, Haitian Creole and Sranan, Bickerton identified twelve features which he believed to be integral to any creole:
Sentence structure: subject–verb–object word order, with similar mechanisms for using word order to apply focus to one of these constituents.
Articles: definite article applied to specific and identified noun phrase, indefinite article applied to specific and newly asserted noun phrase, and zero for nonspecific noun phrase.
TMA (tense–modality–aspect) systems
distinction of realized and unrealized complements
relativization and subject-copying
negation
existential and possessive
copula
adjectives as verbs
questions
question words
passive equivalents

Having analyzed these features, he believed that he was able to characterize, at least partly, the properties of innate grammar. In his LBH, Bickerton defined very precisely what he considers to be a creole: a language that has arisen out of a prior pidgin that had not existed for more than a generation and among a population where, at most, 20% were speakers of the dominant language and where the remaining 80% were linguistically diverse.

Bickerton puts emphasis on children's contribution to the development of a creole and the abrupt character of this process.

Normally, the grammar behind such utterances made by children is eventually altered as parents continue to model a grammar different from this innate one.  Presumably, if such children were removed from exposure to English parents, their grammars would continue to be that of creole languages.

 argue that this emphasis on child-input implies two different linguistic communities but that it is far simpler and more consistent with the data from multilingual communities to assume that the two groups form one speech community, and that both make contributions to the development of the emergent creole. Also,  points out that children were scarce on plantations, where creoles appeared, for several reasons, including absence of women as well as high rates of sterility, miscarriage, and infant mortality.

Verbal system
The verb conjugation is typically close to an ideal tense–modality–aspect pattern.  In this system, the absence or presence of auxiliary verbs indicate tense (concurrent or anterior), modality (realis or irrealis) and aspect (punctual or progressive), and when present these auxiliaries occur in that order, and typically are based on similar meaning words in the pidgin or superstrate language.  Thus anterior tense may be marked by words such as bin in English-based creoles (from been), or té in French-based creoles (from été), a future or subjunctive tense may be marked by go (from English go) or al (from French aller), and a non-punctual (non-stative) aspect by a word such as stei (from English stay).

The above table demonstrates syntactic similarities of creole languages.  Stative verbs are those that cannot form the nonpunctual aspect.  According to Bickerton, all observed creole languages strictly follow a structure that has the anterior particle precede the irreal particle, and the irreal particle precede the nonpunctual particle, although in certain languages some compounded forms may be replaced by other constructions.

Creole Prototype
McWhorter contributed to the LBH with his Creole Prototype Theory, which argues that creoles exhibit some features that may be used to distinguish them from other languages without referring to the socio-historical dimension.
to use grammatical inflection via affixing,
to develop productive, nontransparent derivational affixes, or
to use tone to either mark lexical differences or as grammatical markers.

These features do not appear in creoles because creoles are relatively young languages, but they may appear later on in their grammars as the languages change. He does not claim that all creoles are ideal examples of the prototype, rather they exhibit varying degrees of conformity with the  prototype.

Proposed empirical study
Bickerton proposed in 1976 an empirical test of his theory, which involved putting families speaking mutually unintelligible languages on a previously uninhabited island for three years.  Federal funding for the test was obtained, but the experiment was cancelled over concerns that informed consent could not be obtained, given the breadth of unknown possible hazards of participation.

Criticism 
Several aspects of the LBH have attracted criticism.  disputes some of Bickerton's claims about Hawai'i Creole, claiming that the linguistic input of the children was not impoverished, since it came from an expanded pidgin, not a rudimentary one. Siegel also claims the features of Hawai'i Creole are not that similar to other creoles and that the substrate languages (especially Cantonese and Portuguese) were a significant source of grammatical features. Siegel also makes the point that Hawai'i Creole emerged over two generations, not one.

Bickerton's definition excludes many languages that might be called creoles. Moreover, lack of historical data makes it often impossible to evaluate such claims.

See also
Monogenetic theory of pidgins
Origin of language
Origin of speech
 Innateness hypothesis

References

Bibliography

 

 
 

 

Pidgins and creoles
Language acquisition
Bioprogram theory